Yakan is an Austronesian language primarily spoken on Basilan Island in the Philippines. It is the native language of the Yakan people, the indigenous as well as the largest ethnic group on the island. It has a total of 110,000 native speakers. Despite being located in the Philippines, it is not closely related to other languages of the country. It is a member of the Sama-Bajaw languages, which in turn are related to the Barito languages spoken in southern Borneo, Madagascar and Mayotte.

Phonology

Vowels

Consonants

The following chart lists the consonant phonemes of Yakan.

The consonant d is usually realized between vowels as a flap [], although some speakers use the stop [] in all positions.

References

Bibliography

External links
Omniglot's entry on the Yakan language
Online Yakan-English dictionary accessible from SIL Philippines's website
Grammar description from Brainard and Behrens (2002), accessible via Rosetta Project

Sama–Bajaw languages
Languages of Basilan
Languages of the Philippines